Super is a 2010 American black comedy superhero film written and directed by James Gunn and starring Rainn Wilson, Elliot Page, Liv Tyler, Kevin Bacon and Nathan Fillion. It tells the story of Frank Darbo, a short-order cook who becomes a superhero without having any superhuman ability, calling himself the "Crimson Bolt". He sets out to rescue his wife Sarah from the hands of a drug dealer.

The film premiered at the 2010 Toronto International Film Festival and was released in theaters in the United States on April 1, 2011 and on video on demand on April 13, 2011. The film was released unrated in U.S. theaters, and later received an R rating for its DVD/Blu-ray release. Upon release, Super received mixed reviews from critics and grossed over $590,000 against a budget of $2.5 million, making it Gunn's lowest-grossing film.

In 2019, Wilson reprised his role as the Crimson Bolt in the mid-credits scene of Gunn's supervillain film Brightburn, via a new photo taken for the film.

Plot
Short-order cook Frank Darbo recalls his only two good memories from a disappointing life: marrying his wife, Sarah, and an incident in which he directed a police officer to catch a purse snatcher. Frank immortalizes these two events in a pair of crayon drawings that he hangs on his wall for inspiration. Sarah, a recovering addict, leaves Frank for Jacques, a charismatic strip club owner who gets her hooked on drugs. Frank sinks into depression, where he has a vision in which he is touched by the finger of God and meets the Holy Avenger, a superhero from a public-access television show (based on the actual Christian superhero series, Bibleman), who tells Frank that God has chosen him for a very special purpose.

Frank believes that God has chosen him to become a superhero and goes to a local comic book store for inspiration. His claim that he is designing a new superhero is met with enthusiastic appreciation from the store clerk, Libby. Frank creates a superhero costume and assumes the identity of "The Crimson Bolt". Armed with a pipe wrench, he begins to fight crime by delivering savage beatings to various rulebreakers, ranging from drug dealers and child molesters to a man who cuts in line at the movies. The Crimson Bolt soon becomes a media sensation. Initially, the media view him as a violent psychopath, but he begins to gain public appreciation after the criminal backgrounds of many of his victims come to light.

Frank later attempts to rescue Sarah at Jacques' house, but Jacques' thugs recognize him under the costume and shoot him in the leg as he flees while climbing over a fence. A wounded Frank goes to Libby for help. Libby cajoles Frank into letting her become the Crimson Bolt's "kid sidekick", christening herself "Boltie" and designing a costume. She proves to be even more unhinged than Frank, using her superhero guise to nearly kill a man who possibly vandalized her friend's car. Frank decides to let her go, but changes his mind when Libby rescues him from some of Jacques' thugs at a gas station. Libby soon becomes enamored of Frank, but he turns down her advances, insisting that he is still married.

Arguing that it is different when they are in their superhero identities, Libby rapes Frank while the two are in costume (although she claims to have been suffering from sexsomnia). Frank runs to the bathroom and vomits, where he encounters a vision of Sarah in the toilet. He decides that it is time to rescue her from Jacques. Armed with guns, pipe bombs, and bulletproof vests, Frank and Libby sneak into Jacques' ranch, killing the first few guards they encounter. However, they are both shot. Frank is struck in the chest, his bulletproof vest sparing him, but Libby is shot in the head and killed.

Devastated by her death, Frank goes into a rage, slaughtering all of Jacques' thugs. Inside, Jacques shoots Frank, but Frank gains the upper hand and stabs Jacques to death as Sarah watches, horrified. Frank takes her home, and she stays with him for a few months "out of a sense of obligation" for saving her life, Frank surmises. One day, Frank returns home to find Sarah has left him again. This time, she manages to overcome her addiction and uses her experiences to help others with similar problems.

She marries a man named Patrick and has four children. Frank is convinced that her children will change the world for the better. Frank, content and now with a pet bunny, looks on his wall of happy memories. The wall is covered with pictures of his experiences from his time spent with Libby and pictures of Sarah's kids, who call him "Uncle Frank". Frank looks at Libby's picture, and a tear runs down his cheek.

Cast

 Rainn Wilson as Frank Darbo / The Crimson Bolt
 Grant Goodman as Young Frank Darbo
 Elliot Page as Libby / Boltie
 Liv Tyler as Sarah Helgeland
 Kevin Bacon as Jacques
 Nathan Fillion as The Holy Avenger
 Michael Rooker as Abe, a conspiracy theorist
 Gregg Henry as Detective John Felkner
 Andre Royo as Hamilton
 Sean Gunn as Toby
 Stephen Blackehart as Quill
 Greg Ingram as Long-Haired Hood
 William Katt as Sgt. Fitzgibbon
 Linda Cardellini as Maria, the Pet Store Employee
 Rob Zombie as God (voice)
 Don Mac as Mr. Range
 Zach Gilford as Jerry
 Steve Agee as Comic Book Store Employee
 Mollie Milligan as Jennifer Helgeland
 James Gunn as Demonswill
 Daniel Mignault as Feature / Brother

Production

Super was filmed between December 9, 2009, and January 24, 2010, in Shreveport, Louisiana, with additional shooting at director James Gunn's home in Los Angeles, California (the comic book store shown in the film is a real store, ComicSmash, in Studio City). Since the film was a low-budget, independent project, everyone involved in the film was paid scale (the minimum allowed by the Screen Actors Guild). Tyler Bates worked on the soundtrack.

Gunn has said in interviews that he had been working on the script for Super since 2002, but he had a hard time getting it made, as producers felt that the content was too violent and esoteric. In addition, Gunn had a hard time deciding on the right actor to play Frank; John C. Reilly was Gunn's top choice, but he wasn't considered to be a big enough star for the film to get made. After Slither was made, Gunn had effectively put the project on hold until his ex-wife Jenna Fischer encouraged him to go through with it and recommended Rainn Wilson, her co-star from The Office. Wilson read the script while on set and decided he wanted to join the film, and in turn sent the script to Elliot Page, with whom he had worked in Juno, who immediately accepted the role of Libby.

Super was Gunn's second film dealing with superheroes, the first being The Specials in 2000 that he wrote, but did not direct. Gunn has said that examining superheroes from a different angle interests him, and that he may do more films concerning the subject in the future. He was later chosen to direct the 2014 Marvel Studios superhero film Guardians of the Galaxy, its 2017 and 2023 sequels, Guardians of the Galaxy Vol. 2 and Guardians of the Galaxy Vol. 3, the 2021 DC Comics film The Suicide Squad and its  2022 TV series spin-off Peacemaker, and produced the 2019 dark superhero horror film Brightburn, in which Rainn Wilson also briefly reprises his role as Frank Darbo in photographic form indicating that Super and Brightburn are set in the same universe.

Reception

Critical response
Super received mixed reviews from critics, who debated the moral ambiguity, violence and messages, but still received praise for the acting, tone, writing and humor. The site's critics consensus reads, "Super intriguing premise and talented cast are drowned in a blood-red sea of graphic violence, jarring tonal shifts, and thinly written characters." At Metacritic, the film has a weighted average score of 50 out of 100 based on 27 critics, indicating "mixed or average reviews". Catherine Bray of Film4 wrote, "It's not that this type of movie shouldn't be made—this type of movie could be brilliant—but it plays like every first draft idea anyone had found its way to the screen because it made someone laugh over a few drinks ... Some really interesting ideas and the odd flash of awesomeness, but overall a big old misfire with some ill-judged nastiness." Al Kratina reporting at the Fantasia Film Festival wrote, "There's a great movie somewhere inside James Gunn's dark comedy. Super ... Super is an undeniably entertaining film. But there's something off about it ... Super is a funny film, a twisted story, and occasionally a very good movie, just rarely at the same time."

Entertainment Weekly critic Owen Gleiberman wrote, "This trifle about a doofus who becomes a costumed superhero, even though he has no special powers, might have seemed funkier before Kick-Ass. Yet the movie is written and directed by James Gunn with a certain whimsical black-comic flair ... It's really a one-joke movie, but the joke is a good one: Frank's 'crusade' is just a geek's screw-loose revenge, which Wilson, digging into the character's misery, makes oddly sympathetic." Conversely, Scott Weinberg of Cinematical wrote, "Chock full of insanely graphic violence, awash in thoroughly un-PC perspectives, and more than willing to keep on punching long after the audience is virtually incredulous, Super is fun and funny, dark and twisted, semi-schizophrenic and certifiably insane. What I liked most was its simple audacity. And [Elliot] Page."

Box office
Super made $46,549 on opening weekend with eleven theaters, averaging $4,232 per theater, which was considered by analysts to be "a disappointing start" for the film. Conversely, the film fared better on VOD and had been anticipated to be the most successful film VOD for IFC. As of 2011, it made over $1,5 million on DVD and Blu-ray sales.

During an interview actor Rainn Wilson explained his thoughts about the struggling box office performance, saying the risky tonal decision worked against the film in its limited theatrical release: "It is a comedy. It's also an action movie, and it's also a drama, and it's also a really [messed] up genre, cult type of film. It's all of those things at one time, and people are not used to it. They're used to like, oh, 'The Avengers' has some comedy in it, but it's action, and it's a comic-book-type thing. People really know exactly what world they're in. But in this one, it mixes so many different worlds, you're really off-balance. 'Cause you don't know if the next scene is going to be someone crying, or it's going to be ludicrous or it's going to be an animated sequence or an action sequence. You just don't know."

Awards
At the 2011 Fantasia Film Festival, Super was tied with the documentary Superheroes for the AQCC Prize; "For two films that perfectly capture the Zeitgeist of our age and that present elaborate reflections on one of the biggest Americans trends, the AQCC Jury has awarded its best international film prize, in a tie, to the fiction film Super by James Gunn and to the documentary Superheroes by Michael Barnett, two strong and complementary works."

Soundtrack
Music featured on the movie's soundtrack includes hit songs such as Eric Carmen's "It Hurts Too Much" and Cheap Trick's "If You Want My Love".

Similarity to Kick-Ass
Close to the time that Super was released, another film on the topic of amateur superheroes, Kick-Ass, was released.

During the production process, Gunn, a friend of Kick-Ass creator Mark Millar, learned of the other film. In an interview after Super was released, he commented that "I was definitely wary of it, I was like 'This sucks! Kick-Ass is being made into a movie; is that gonna mean we're irrelevant?' But in the end the stories are so different. Our movie is about a guy who's on his own sort of spiritual quest and he just happens to wear a superhero costume during it. But it's really about the guy and not the costume."

Millar later defended Super in light of accusations that it was copying his work with, "People have said to me, 'Oh my God, he's ripping off Kick-Ass,' because it's coming out one year later, but James was doing this when I was doing Kick-Ass as well. Both projects were coming together at exactly the same time." Millar went on to screen Super at his Kapow! comic convention in London.

Gunn also responded to the accusations, pointing out that "It sucks on the one hand and then on the other hand, who gives a shit? There are 4,000 bank heist movies. We can have five superheroes-without-powers movies. What does bum me out [is] people who pretend like Kick-Ass was the first superheroes without powers movie, when that's obviously the classic John Ritter film Hero at Large."

Notes

References

External links

 
 
 Super at IFC Films
 
 

2010 films
2010 action comedy films
2010 action drama films
2010 black comedy films
2010 independent films
2010s action comedy-drama films
2010s superhero films
American action comedy-drama films
American black comedy films
American films with live action and animation
American independent films
American superhero films
American vigilante films
Films about rape
Films directed by James Gunn
Films scored by Tyler Bates
Films shot in New Orleans
Films with screenplays by James Gunn
Fiction about God
Superhero black comedy films
Superhero comedy-drama films
2010s vigilante films
2010s English-language films
2010s American films